As-Sunan al-Kubra,, is a hadith book collected by Imam Al-Nasa'i (214 – 303 AH), not to be confused with the same titled book by Imam Al-Bayhaqi.

Description
As-Sunan al-Kubra is the larger collection of the Sunan al-Nasa'i, having almost twelve thousand (12000) hadiths compared to the almost six thousand (6000) hadiths in the summarised version. The shorter collection is considered the next most authentic book of hadith (narrations of Prophet Muhammad) after the Sahihain (Sahih al-Bukhari & Sahih Muslim) within the six books, by most scholars of hadith.

Commentaries
Among those  who have written commentaries on this hadith collection are: 
  Kitab al-Sunan al-Kubra al-Nasa'i 12 Volumes (كِتَابُ السُّنَن الكُبْرَى النَّسَائي) Commentary by Shaykh Shuaib Al Arna'ut & Shaykh al-Turki: Published: al-Risalah al-'Alamiyyah | Damascus/Beirut, Syria/Lebanon in 2011

See also
 List of Sunni books
 Kutub al-Sittah
 Sahih Bukhari
 Sahih Muslim
 Jami al-Tirmidhi
 Sunan Abu Dawood
 Either: Sunan ibn Majah, or Muwatta Malik

References

External links
 
Sunan An Nasai - Searchable Sunan Al Sughra by Imam An Nasai

9th-century Arabic books
10th-century Arabic books
Sunni literature
Hadith
Hadith collections
Sunni hadith collections